The jirba ( (also spelled ; also transliterated dzirba, girba) is a traditional folk instrument from Bahrain. It is a droneless, double-reeded, single-chantered bagpipe, played particularly by ethnic Iranians, as well as on the Kuwaiti island of Faylaka. The bag is usually made from the skin of a goat, and filled with air via the mouth. The lower part of the bag is attached to a wooden flute like instrument which has either 4 or 6 holes. The two reeds are positioned side by side which produce a harmonious double note.

See also
 Habban
 Ney anban

Sources
"The art of the "jirbah" (in Arabic)

Bagpipes
Arabic musical instruments
Bahraini musical instruments
Kuwaiti musical instruments